Acer wardii is an uncommon Asian species of maple. It is found at high elevations (2400–3600 m) in Tibet, Yunnan, Myanmar, and Assam.

Acer wardii is a deciduous shrub or small tree up to 5 meters tall with dark gray bark. Leaves are non-compound, up to 9 cm wide and 8 cm across, thin and papery, with 3 lobes and many small teeth.

References

External links
line drawing for Flora of China figure 1 at top

wardii
Flora of Tibet
Flora of Yunnan
Flora of Arunachal Pradesh
Flora of Myanmar
Plants described in 1917